Highland station is a SEPTA Regional Rail station in Philadelphia, Pennsylvania. Located at 8412 Seminole Avenue at Highland Avenue in the Chestnut Hill neighborhood, it serves the Chestnut Hill West Line. The Pennsylvania Railroad initiated service on June 11, 1884.

The station is in zone 2 on the Chestnut Hill West Line, on former Pennsylvania Railroad tracks, and is 10.7 track miles from Suburban Station. In 2004, this station saw 32 boardings on an average weekday. More recently, usage appears to have doubled, but there is still considerable unused free parking in the Philadelphia Parking Authority lot (outbound side) and on the adjacent streets. The only shelter is a small Plexiglas hut on the inbound side.

Station layout

References

External links
SEPTA – Highland Station
 Highland Avenue and Seminole Street entrance from Google Maps Street View

SEPTA Regional Rail stations
Former Pennsylvania Railroad stations
Railway stations in the United States opened in 1884
Railway stations in Philadelphia